Parti social-démocrate may refer to:

 Social Democratic Party (Benin)
 Social Democratic Party (France) (defunct)
 Social Democratic Party (Gabon)
 Social Democratic Party (Luxembourg) (defunct)
 Social Democratic Party (Rwanda)
 Social Democratic Party/Jant Bi, Senegal
 Mauritian Social Democrat Party

See also 
 Social Democratic Party